The Fujinon XF 90mm F2 R LM WR is an interchangeable camera lens announced by Fujifilm on May 18, 2015.

References

90
Camera lenses introduced in 2015